Unión Carolina is a Peruvian football club, playing in the city of Puno, Peru.

History
In the 2005 Copa Perú, the club classified to the National Stage, but was eliminated by the Senati FBC of Arequipa.

Its eternal rival one is the Alfonso Ugarte with which disputes the Derby of the city of Puno. At present participates in the Liga Superior de Puno.

Rivalries
Unión Carolina has had a long-standing rivalry with Diablos Rojos, Alfonso Ugarte and Real Carolino.

Honours

Regional
Región VIII:
Runner-up (1): 2005

Liga Departamental de Puno:
Winners (3): 1966, 1967, 2006
 Runner-up (1): 2005

Liga Superior de Puno:
 Runner-up (1): 2009

See also
List of football clubs in Peru
Peruvian football league system

References

External links
Carolinos Granuidad
Unión Carolina.net

Football clubs in Peru
Association football clubs established in 1905
1905 establishments in Peru